The 1934 Czechoslovak presidential election took place on 24 May 1934. Tomáš Garrigue Masaryk was elected for his fourth term.

Background
Tomáš Garrigue Masaryk was 84 years old when his third term concluded. He wanted Edvard Beneš to become his successor but Beneš didn't have required support and Masaryk decided to run instead of him. Masaryk had to deal with poor health and suffered a stroke prior to election. Communist Party of Czechoslovakia nominated Klement Gottwald as its candidate.

Procedure
President was elected by bicameral parliament that consisted of 300 Deputies and 150 Senators. Candidate needed 60% of votes to be elected.

Voting

418 electors voted. Masaryk received 327 votes while Gottwald received 38 votes. 53 Ballots were blank.

Aftermath
Masaryk resigned on 14 December 1935 and Edvard Beneš was elected his successor.

References

Presidential
1934